Eleven is the eleventh studio album by the Japanese rock duo B'z, released on December 6, 2000. The album sold only 756,910 copies in its first week, becoming the first full-length studio album not to sell a million copies in its first week since Risky. However, the album managed to sell over 1,132,180 copies.

Track listing
"  I  " – 0:24
"Seventh Heaven" – 4:10
"信じるくらいいいだろう" [Shinjiru Kurai Ii Darou] – 3:39
"Ring" – 3:59
"愛のprisoner" [Ai no prisoner] – 4:09
"煌めく人" [Kirameku Hito] – 2:57
"May" – 4:19
"Juice (PM mix)" – 4:02
"Raging River" – 7:32
"Tokyo Devil" – 3:25
"コブシヲニギレ" [KOBUSHIWONIGIRE] – 4:32
"Thinking of You" – 4:30
"扉" [Tobira] – 2:51
"今夜月の見える丘に -Alternative Guitar Solo ver.-" [Konya Tsuki no Mieru Oka ni] – 4:10

Personnel
Tak Matsumoto (guitar, bass)
Koshi Inaba (vocals, blues harp)

Additional personnel
Akihito Tokunaga (clavinet) - Track 2
Akira Onozuka (acoustic piano) - Track 4, 7, 9, 14
Brian Tichy (drums) - Track 2, 5, 8
Daisuke Ikeda (strings arrangement) - Track 4, 9
Fingers (bass) - Track 8
Futoshi Kobayashi (trumpet) - Track 2
Hideo Yamaki (drums) - Track 4, 9, 12
Kaichi Kurose (drums) - Track 3, 6, 10, 11, 13
Katsunori "hakkai" Hatakeyama (Chinese gong) - Track 10
Kazuki Katsuta (saxophone) - Track 2
Koji "Kiratoh" Nakamura (bass) - Track 4, 12, 14
Masao Akashi (bass) - Track 3, 6, 10, 11
Shinozaki Strings (strings) - Track 4, 9
Shiro Sasaki (trumpet) - Track 2
Showtaro Mitsuzono (bass) - Track 13
Tama Chorus (mixed chorus) - Track 9
Vagabond Suzuki (bass) - Track 7, 9
Wakaba Kawai (trombone) - Track 2

Certifications

External links
B'z official Web site (in Japanese)

B'z albums
2000 albums
Japanese-language albums